Ernst Gunther II, Duke of Schleswig-Holstein (11 August 1863 – 22 February 1921), was a son of Frederick VIII, Duke of Schleswig-Holstein and Princess Adelheid of Hohenlohe-Langenburg. He inherited his father's title as titular third duke of Schleswig-Holstein.

Marriage 
On 2 August 1898 in Coburg, Saxe-Coburg and Gotha, he married Princess Dorothea of Saxe-Coburg and Gotha, daughter of Prince Philipp of Saxe-Coburg and Gotha and Princess Louise of Belgium. The grandfather of the bride, King Leopold II, did not attend the wedding but sent the Grand Cordon of the Order of Leopold as wedding gift.

The couple had no children. However, on 11 November 1920, Ernst Gunther adopted Prince Johann Georg and his sister Princess Marie Luise, children of Prince Albrecht of Schleswig-Holstein-Sonderburg-Glücksburg.

Honours
He received the following orders and decorations:

Ancestors

References 

''This article is a translation of the corresponding article on the Swedish Wikipedia, accessed 8 May 2007.

House of Augustenburg
Members of the Prussian House of Lords
1863 births
1921 deaths
Princes of Schleswig-Holstein-Sonderburg-Augustenburg
People from Lubsko
Grand Crosses of the Order of Saint Stephen of Hungary
Knights Grand Cross of the Order of Saints Maurice and Lazarus
Recipients of the Order of the Netherlands Lion
People from the Province of Brandenburg
Generals of Cavalry (Prussia)
Grand Crosses of the Order of Vasa